Agathymus aryxna, the Arizona giant skipper, is a butterfly in the family Hesperiidae described by Harrison Gray Dyar Jr. in 1905. Its range includes Central  and North America.

The MONA or Hodges number for Agathymus aryxna is 4132.

References

Further reading
Arnett, Ross H. (2000). American Insects: A Handbook of the Insects of America North of Mexico. CRC Press.
Hodges, Ronald W., et al., eds. (1983). Check List of the Lepidoptera of America North of Mexico, xxiv + 284.
Opler, Paul A. (1999). A Field Guide to Western Butterflies. Second edition, xiv + 540.
Pelham, Jonathan P. (2008). "A catalogue of the butterflies of the United States and Canada with a complete bibliography of the descriptive and systematic literature". Journal of Research on the Lepidoptera, vol. 40, xiv + 658.

External links
Butterflies and Moths of North America

Megathyminae
Butterflies described in 1905